The 2006 American Le Mans Series season was the 36th season for the IMSA GT Championship, with the eighth as the American Le Mans Series.  It was a series for Le Mans Prototypes (LMP) and Grand Touring (GT) race cars divided into 4 classes: LMP1, LMP2, GT1, and GT2.  It began March 18, 2006, and ended October 21, 2006 after 10 races.

Pre-season
Among the biggest announcements prior to the start of the 2006 season was that Audi would continue their involvement in the ALMS with their new R10 TDI diesel engined LMP1 with the car making its international racing debut at the 12 Hours of Sebring in preparation for Le Mans.  Audi followed up this announcement with plans for a single Audi R8 to go on a farewell tour for the first few races after Sebring, and then be replaced by two new R10 TDI after Le Mans for the rest of the ALMS season.

Fellow LMP1 competitors Dyson Racing also announced an upgrade from their troublesome Lola EX257s to brand new B06/10s with the new AER Turbo V8 engine unit.  As part of their purchase, Dyson in turn sold off their EX257s.  Occasional ALMS entrant Autocon Motorsports bought one chassis, while former Intersport partner Highcroft Racing bought the other, leading to an enlarged LMP1 field for 2006.

In LMP2 the teams of Miracle Motorsports, B-K Motorsports, Intersport Racing, and Penske Racing all planned to make a return to the series.  Penske's initial one-car effort towards the end of 2005 was expanded to two cars for 2006, while the four other teams kept their efforts the same.

In GT1, the field appeared to be shrinking.  Corvette Racing's commitment was certain, but Aston Martin Racing, now running Pirelli tires instead of Michelin, was only able to promise Sebring in the beginning, later stating they'd also run Houston and Mid-Ohio in preparation for Le Mans.  Their involvement for the rest of the season was left as merely a rumor.  ACEMCO Motorsports's future in ALMS was also uncertain, with the team scrounging for cash to be able to continue racing.  Former GT1 team Carsport America finally folded following the 2005 season, with their Dodge Viper GTS-R greatly outdated.  The involvement of Maserati in the series was also pulled due to the cancelling of the project by the corporate heads since it never reached its initial plans, and the continued restrictions put in place by IMSA.

The GT2 class was also more of the same, with returning favorites Flying Lizard Motorsports, J3 Racing, Petersen/White Lightning, Panoz Motorsports, and Alex Job, although Alex Job's effort was now brought down to a single entry due to his expanded involvement in Grand-Am.  Risi Competizione, who had run the Maserati in 2005, promised to return to GT2 with Ferrari's upcoming replacement to the Ferrari 360, the new F430.

The ALMS also created a new class of competitors, known as GT2S, designed to allow racing cars based on production vehicles which had seats for four in a coupe or sedan body style.  Cars of this type were now allowed by ACO rules, but IMSA agreed that these cars would not be eligible for Le Mans entry even if they won Petit Le Mans or the season championship.  These cars however would be competitively equal to the GT2 class and would compete accordingly with them.  The long time BMW factory supported effort of Team PTG announced their return of the BMW M3 to the series, while Lexus announced their intentions to bring a new purpose built racing car built off of the IS.  Rumors also speculated that Cadillac could bring their CTS-V SpeedGT program to the series.  However, come the beginning of the season, neither Lexus nor Cadillac showed, leaving the BMW M3 as the only true GT2S competitor.  The GT2S notion was shelved midseason.

From the standpoint of the 2006 schedule, two major changes were made.  First, to replace the earlier round at Road Atlanta held soon after Sebring, a new temporary street circuit near Houston's Reliant Park was announced in cooperation with Champ Car.  The round at Infineon Raceway was replaced with Miller Motorsports Park, a new racing facility near Salt Lake City.

Schedule

All races are 2 Hours and 45 Minutes except for Sebring (12 Hours), Petit Le Mans (10 Hours or 1000 Miles), and Laguna Seca (4 Hours).

Season results

Overall winner in bold.

Teams championship

Points are awarded to the top 10 finishers in the following order:
 20-16-13-10-8-6-4-3-2-1
Exceptions were for the 4 Hour Monterey Sports Car Championships was scored in the following order:
 23-19-16-13-11-9-7-6-5-4
And for the 12 Hours of Sebring and Petit Le Mans which award the top 10 finishers in the following order:
 26-22-19-16-14-12-10-9-8-7

Cars failing to complete 70% of the winner's distance are not awarded points.  Teams only score the points of their highest finishing entry in each race.

LMP1 standings

LMP2 standings

GT1 standings

GT2 standings

Drivers championship

Points are awarded to the top 10 finishers in the following order:
 20-16-13-10-8-6-4-3-2-1
Exceptions were for the 4 Hour Monterey Sports Car Championships was scored in the following order:
 23-19-16-13-11-9-7-6-5-4
And for the 12 Hours of Sebring and the Petit Le Mans, which award the top 10 finishers in the following order:
 26-22-19-16-14-12-10-9-8-7

Cars failing to complete 70% of the winner's distance are not awarded points.  Drivers failing to drive for at least 45 minutes in the race are not awarded points.

LMP1 standings

LMP2 standings

GT1 standings

GT2 standings

External links
 American Le Mans Series homepage
 IMSA ALMS Results and Standings

 
American Le Mans Series seasons
American Le Mans
American Le Mans Series